Dottie West Sings Sacred Ballads is a studio album by American country music artist Dottie West. It was released in July 1967 on RCA Victor Records and was produced by Chet Atkins. The album was West's sixth studio effort and only gospel music collection to be released during her career. The album did not spawn any singles nor did it reach positions on any national publication charts.

Background, content and reception
Dottie West Sings Sacred Ballads was produced by Chet Atkins in February 1967 at the RCA Victor Studio in Nashville, Tennessee. It was West's sixth studio album recorded with Atkins and her sixth album overall. It was also her first album of gospel music to be released in her career. The album's liner notes were written by West's mother in law. On the project, her husband is featured playing steel guitar. The album contained a total of 12 tracks. All of the tracks were cover versions of well known gospel and inspirational songs. Included were renditions of "How Great Thou Art", "His Eye Is on the Sparrow", "Lord's Prayer" and "You'll Never Walk Alone".

The album was released in July 1967, becoming her third studio recording issued that year. The album was first offered as a vinyl LP, with six songs on each side of the record. It was later reissued tot digital retailers in the 2010s. The album's release was first announced in a July 1967 issue of Billboard magazine. It did not produce any singles at the time of its release nor did it appear on any Billboard album publications. The album was nominated at the 10th Annual Grammy Awards for Best Sacred Recording, becoming her seventh award nomination from the Grammy's. The album would later receive 4.5 out of 5 stars from Allmusic.

Track listing

Original vinyl version

Digital version

Personnel
All credits are adapted from the liner notes of Dottie West Sings Sacred Ballads.

Musical personnel
 Harold Bradley – guitar
 Jerry Carrigan – drums
 Floyd Cramer – piano
 Ray Edenton – guitar
 Buddy Harman – drums
 Roy Huskey – bass
 The Jordanaires – background vocals
 Grady Martin – guitar
 The Nashville A Strings – strings
 Hargus "Pig" Robbins – piano
 Henry Strzelecki – bass
 Bill West – steel guitar
 Dottie West – lead vocals

Technical personnel
 Chet Atkins – producer
 Jim Malloy – engineering

Release history

References

1967 albums
Albums produced by Chet Atkins
Christian music albums by American artists
Dottie West albums
RCA Records albums